Hot Rhythm is a 1944 American musical comedy film directed by William Beaudine and starring Robert Lowery, Dona Drake, and the radio and vaudeville team of Tim and Irene (Tim Ryan and Irene Ryan).

Plot
J. P. O'Hara (Tim Ryan) owns the Beacon Recording Company, with studio and distribution facilities. His biggest attraction is singer-bandleader Tommy Taylor (Jerry Cooper), who is managed by "Honest Herman" Strohbach (Robert Kent). Two staff members, Jimmy and Sammy (Robert Lowery and Sidney Miller), are aspiring songwriters who make their living writing radio jingles. They meet singer Mary Adams (Dona Drake), and Jimmy is so taken with her that he resolves to advance her career by any means possible. He records Mary singing along to an instrumental played by Taylor's orchestra, hoping to interest O'Hara in Mary. When Mary's demonstration record is released to the public accidentally, Taylor's manager threatens to sue O'Hara. O'Hara goes around town buying back copies of Mary's record and smashing them in the stores, which lands him in jail. Confusing matters further is O'Hara's new secretary, Polly Kane (Irene Ryan), who makes her own recording and is thus mistaken for mystery vocalist Mary. Mary's stormy romance with Jimmy is finally smoothed over when Jimmy tells O'Hara the truth about his finagling to promote Mary. Mary joins Tommy Taylor's band as his new singing star.

Main cast
 Robert Lowery as Jimmy O'Brien  
 Dona Drake as Mary Adams  
 Tim Ryan as J. P. O'Hara  
 Irene Ryan as Polly Kane 
 Sidney Miller as Sammy Rubin  
 Jerry Cooper as Tommy Taylor  
 Harry Langdon as Mr. Whiffle  
 Robert Kent as Herman Strohbach  
 Lloyd Ingraham as Brown  
 Cyril Ring as Jackson, record-shop proprietor  
 Joan Curtis as Alice Jones  
 Paul Porcasi as Mr. Peroni, cafe owner

Production
Monogram was a "budget" studio that made feature films for a fraction of what the big studios spent. Its hourlong Charlie Chan mysteries of the 1940s typically cost about $90,000 each, compared to the Twentieth Century-Fox Chan films of the 1930s, which cost between $200,000 and $300,000 each. Monogram's Chan films were instrumental in getting other Monogram features shown in more theaters, resulting in a period of ambitious expansion for the studio. Hot Rhythm was Monogram's biggest production of 1944, with an unusually long running time of 79 minutes, and with the studio's top cameraman Ira H. Morgan and director William Beaudine joining forces to make the economically staged scenes look more elaborate.

References

Bibliography
 Michael L. Stephens. Art Directors in Cinema: A Worldwide Biographical Dictionary. McFarland, 1998.

External links
 

1944 films
1944 musical comedy films
1940s English-language films
American musical comedy films
Films directed by William Beaudine
Monogram Pictures films
American black-and-white films
1940s American films